Plasmodium dissanaikei is a parasite of the genus Plasmodium subgenus Giovannolaia.

Like all Plasmodium species P. dissanaikei has both vertebrate and insect hosts. The vertebrate hosts for this parasite are birds.

Taxonomy 

The parasite was first described by Jong in 1971. On morphological grounds it is related to Plasmodium durae.

Distribution 

This species is found in Sri Lanka (Ceylon).

Hosts 

Hosts of this species include the Ross-ringed Parakeet (Psittacula krameri manillensis) and species from the Columbidae - pigeons and doves.

References 

dissanaikei
Parasites of birds